Catherine Mary Hills is a British archaeologist and academic, who is a leading expert in Anglo-Saxon material culture. She is a senior research fellow at the McDonald Institute for Archaeological Research, University of Cambridge.

Education 
In the 1960s, Hill excavated with Phillip Rahtz at Beckery chapel, Glastonbury.

Career 
She was appointed as a lecturer in Cambridge in 1977 in the Department of Archaeology. Previous to that she was a Field Officer for Norfolk Archaeological Unit. Hills was elected as a Fellow of the Society of Antiquaries in 1978. She was a Fellow of Newnham College.

Hills was closely associated with the excavation of the famous early Anglo-Saxon cremation cemetery at Spong Hill, North Elmham, Norfolk, where she directed excavations from 1974 until the completion of excavations in 1981. Hills' post-excavation analyses of this major site led to substantial contributions in the fields of early Anglo-Saxon archaeology, particularly regarding burial and migration, and more recently the chronology of the 5th century.

She presented the Channel 4 series The Blood of the British. She is Vice-President of the Society for Medieval Archaeology from 2017-2022.

Selected publications 
 Hills, C. (1979). The archaeology of Anglo-Saxon England in the pagan period: A review. Anglo-Saxon England, 8, 297-329. 
 Hills C.M. (1986). The Blood of the British. London: George Philip
 Hills C.M. (2003). Origins of the English. London: Gerald Duckworth and Co. Ltd.
 Hills, C. (2007). History and archaeology: The state of play in early medieval Europe. Antiquity 81(311), 191-200. 
 Hills, C. (2011) Overview: Anglo‐Saxon Identity. The Oxford Handbook of Anglo-Saxon Archaeology. Oxford: OUP.
 Hills C. and Lucy S. (2013). Spong Hill Part IX. Chronology and Synthesis. Cambridge: McDonald Inst of Archaeological Research.

References 

Year of birth missing (living people)
Living people
British women archaeologists
British archaeologists
Academics of the University of Cambridge
Fellows of the Society of Antiquaries of London
Fellows of Newnham College, Cambridge
Anglo-Saxon archaeologists